The 2020 Baltic Rowing Championships were held in Trakai, Lithuania on 7–8 of August 2020. Rowers from Lithuania, Latvia and Estonia competed for the Baltic champions title.

Medallists

Men's

Women's

Medal table

References

External links 
 Lithuanian Rowing Federation

2020 in rowing
Baltic Track
Rowing competitions in Lithuania
Sports competitions in Trakai